The Nebraska School Activities Association (NSAA) is a statewide organization which oversees interscholastic competition between high schools in the state of Nebraska. The NSAA is the only interscholastic activities association in Nebraska, thus, it serves both public and private schools.

Classification
The NSAA divides schools into classes, which are continuously assessed by examination of the size of the school's enrollment. Each activity has a varying number of classes, based on the amount of participating schools and the nature of the activity. As such, some classifications separate further into divisions, which are denoted by a "1" or "2" following the classification's letter. Additionally, each activity has its own standards for classification, meaning that a school may compete in a different classification for separate activities.

NSAA Classifications

AA (Limited Use)
Only used for music-based activities; based on ensemble size.
A
Consists of schools with the largest enrollment size, does not separate into divisions. Football teams play standard 11-man football.
B
Does not separate into divisions. Football teams play standard 11-man football.
C
 In certain activities, Class C separates into C-1 and C-2 divisions. Football teams play standard 11-man football.
D
 In certain activities, Class D separates into D-1 and D-2 divisions. Football teams play 8-man football.
 Starting in 2018, a third football-only division, D-6, was established to play 6-man football (a version of the sport invented in Nebraska). This is a revival of Class D-3, which the NSAA governed from 1987–1998; from 1999–2017, 6-man football in Nebraska was organized by associations other than the NSAA.

Sponsored Activities

Fall
 Boys and Girls Cross Country
 Football
 Girls Golf
 Softball
 Boys Tennis
 Volleyball

Winter
 Boys and Girls Basketball
 Boys and Girls Swimming and Diving
 Boys and Girls Wrestling
 Bowling

Spring
 Baseball
 Boys Golf
 Boys and Girls Soccer
 Girls Tennis
 Boys and Girls Track and Field

Year Round
 Debate
 Journalism
 Music
 Play Production
 Speech

Unified Sports® 
In coordination with the Special Olympics, The NSAA developed a set of activities which allow students with and without intellectual disabilities to participate together in a shared competition. Currently, the NSAA offers two Unified Sports®; Unified Bowling and Unified Track and Field.

Non-Sponsored Activities 
Due to Title IX restrictions, limited participation of schools, or other reasons; certain activities are not sponsored by the NSAA, but, though external organizations, high school level competition is provided to Nebraskan high schools. Some of these activities include Cheer and Dance, Ice Hockey, and Trap Shooting. Often, schools organize non-sponsored activities as clubs, as a way to keep school affiliation regulated.

References

External links
 Nebraska School Activities Association

Organizations based in Nebraska
High school sports in Nebraska
High school sports associations in the United States